Kesimpa or Keshimpa is a small village in Mehsana district in the state of Gujarat, India.

Villages in Mehsana district